Sir Thomas Fleming Wilson  (2 June 1862 – 2 April 1929) was a Liberal MP for North East Lanarkshire for around a year.

He was educated at the High School of Glasgow and the University of Glasgow.

He was first elected at the general election of January 1910.  He was re-elected in December 1910, but resigned shortly after, forcing a by-election in March 1911. He was active during the First World War in several areas, including as Clerk to the General Munitions of War Tribunal for Scotland. He was created a Knight Commander of the Order of the British Empire in the 1918 Birthday Honours.

He died in Uddingston, South Lanarkshire, aged 66.

References

External links 
 

1862 births
1929 deaths
Scottish Liberal Party MPs
Members of the Parliament of the United Kingdom for Scottish constituencies
UK MPs 1910
UK MPs 1910–1918
Knights Commander of the Order of the British Empire
People educated at the High School of Glasgow
Alumni of the University of Glasgow